Cerro Ciénaga Grande is a mountain in the Andes of Argentina.

See also
List of mountains in the Andes

Cienaga Grande